Donna's Ranch is a legal, licensed brothel located in Nevada, United States.  Donna's Ranch is situated in Wells, in Elko County, on 8th Street. The ranch traces its history back to 1867 and is owned by Geoff Arnold. The boxer Jack Dempsey was a previous owner.

History
The ranch was originally established near the railroad to serve the men constructing the nearby railroad. Wells was a major cattle pick-up point on the Central Pacific Railway, cowboys who had driven the cattle to the railroad celebrated in the ranch. Local ranchers would give a few cattle to Donna's for credit against future visits.

During the Great Depression, the ranch donated food and money to the people of Wells.

It has undergone several name changes and has been previously known as The Calico Club, Donna's Calico Club, and Chardon's Club.

Arnold purchased the ranch from Evelyn and Ken Merrill in 1999 for $1,000,000.

On February 21, 2008, the ranch survived a 6.0 earthquake, however the interior of the building was trashed. The building was also extensively damaged in a flood on February 7, 2017.

They operated two locations, however the one in Battle Mountain, Nevada in Lander County, closed in 2011. It was subsequently re-opened by new owners under its previous name of The Calico Club.

See also 
 Prostitution in Nevada
 List of brothels in Nevada

References

External links 
 Donna's Ranch website

Brothels in Nevada
Buildings and structures in Elko County, Nevada
Companies established in 1867
1867 establishments in Nevada